
Tearjerker is a Canadian indie rock band based in Toronto, Ontario, consisting of Micah Bonte (vocals, guitar), Trevor Hawkins (drums, samples, production), and Taylor Shute (guitar, bass, vocals, keyboards). 

The band's music has been described as 'shoegaze' and 'dream pop'.

History
Tearjerker was formed in Toronto in 2009.  They released the albums Strangers (2010, re-recorded as Strangers Remade in 2011) and Rare (2011).

In 2014 they self-released the EP Hiding, which was later picked up by SQE Music.

The band's latest album, Stay Wild, was released in 2015. Stay Wild received an 8/10 rating from PopMatters.

Discography

Albums
Slouching (July 2009), Sore Thumb
Strangers (November 2010),  Sore Thumb/Sweat Lodge Guru
Strangers Remade (May 2011), Sore Thumb
Rare (November 2011), Sore Thumb
Stay Wild (2015), Almost Communist

EPs
Worries (2007), Sore Thumb
Hiding (August 2014), SQE
Hiding With Friends (2015), Almost Communist
Really Into You (2016), Almost Communist

Featured appearances
 Toronto's Loveless (My Bloody Valentine cover album) by Various artists (2011), Gold Soundz blog (on track "Sometimes")

References

Musical groups established in 2006
Musical groups from Toronto
Canadian indie rock groups
2006 establishments in Ontario